Alex Salibian is an Armenian-American music producer signed to  Jeff Bhasker's production company, Kravenworks. He has collaborated with artists such as Harry Styles, Young the Giant, The Head and the Heart, Jess Glynne, Mikky Ekko, Cam, and Elle King. A classically trained musician, he has worked extensively in the pop and pop/rock genres in recent years.

His work on Harry Styles' solo debut album Harry Styles includes production and co-writing on each song. He produced and co-wrote Young the Giant’s third album Home of the Strange. Current collaborators in 2020 include BØRNS, Miya Folick, Meg Mac, Misterwives, and Ryan Levine. He is currently based in Los Angeles, California.

Discography

References

Year of birth missing (living people)
Living people
Record producers from California
American people of Armenian descent